The 2000 congressional elections in New Hampshire were held on November 7, 2000 to determine who will represent the state of New Hampshire in the United States House of Representatives.  It coincided with the state's gubernatorial elections. Representatives are elected for two-year terms; those elected served in the 107th Congress from January 2001 until January 2003.  New Hampshire has two seats in the House, apportioned according to the 2000 United States Census.

Overview

References

2000
New Hampshire
2000 New Hampshire elections